Polychrono (Polýchrono) is a town located in the eastern part of the peninsula of Kassandra, Chalkidiki, Greece. Polychrono is situated on the northeastern coast of the peninsula, 4 km northwest of Chaniotis and 85 km southeast of Thessaloniki. There are forests in the mountains near Polychrono, and farmlands near the coast. Tourism is an important sector in Polychrono, attracted by its beach.

In the modern village is placed the site of ancient Neapolis, which in Roman times was rebuilt in a near place with remains of a Roman settlement.

Population

See also
List of settlements in Chalkidiki

References

External links

Populated places in Chalkidiki